Viant Inc. was a multi-national Internet consulting firm, founded in San Francisco in April 1996, that was one of the first web consulting firms during the early stages of the Internet era.

History
The company was founded by Eric Greenberg, Duc Haba, Dwayne Nesmith, and Robbie Vann-Adibé as Silicon Valley Internet Partners (SVIP).

It was one of the first consulting firms to attempt to integrate the disparate disciplines of strategy, 'creative' (design), and technology into a single value proposition and project approach. Such blended multi-disciplinary approaches have since become common.

With investment from Mohr Davidow Ventures, Trident Capital, and Kleiner, Perkins, Caufield & Byers, SVIP grew rapidly.

Robert Gett, from Cambridge Technology Partners, was recruited in mid-1996 in be the CEO. At this point, SVIP corporate functions moved to Boston, Massachusetts. Greenberg left the company in early 1997, and subsequently founded Scient.

SVIP changed its name to Viant in the spring of 1998 after  a company-wide vote. Its San Francisco Bay Area offices relocated in 1998 to the South of Market area in San Francisco.

The company went public in June 1999. By the end of that year Viant reached a stock price of US$ 105 per share and a market capitalization of over $2 billion.

Vann-Adibé left the firm in early 2000.

Business impacted by Dot com bust 

The Dot com bust hit the company hard, forcing layoffs in 2000, 2001 and 2002. Employees later nicknamed each round based on their dates and impact, calling the Dec 7th round (10% cut) the "Pearl Harbor" round, while the March 2001 and 2002 rounds (40% cuts) were referred to as "Hiroshima" and "Nagasaki".

The company was sold in September 2002 to Divine, a company founded by Andrew Filipowski.

See also 
Fast Five (consulting)

References

 
 
 
 "Putting the e in Diversity", Vault.com
 "Viant Opens First International Office in London; Robbie Vann-Adibe and Michael Keany to Head Operations", Looksmart
 
 

Companies disestablished in 2002
Companies established in 1996
Online companies of the United States